Notagonum macleayi is a species of ground beetle in the subfamily Platyninae. It was described by Sloane in 1910.

References

Notagonum
Beetles described in 1910